First Security Field at Estes Stadium is a 10,000-seat multi-purpose stadium in Conway, Arkansas. It is home to the Central Arkansas Bears football team, representing the University of Central Arkansas in the NCAA's ASUN Conference.  The facility opened in 1939. In 2007, university President Lu Hardin announced that corporate sponsorship had been secured for the stadium from a local bank.  As a result, the formal title of the stadium is First Security Field at Estes Stadium. The stadium is named after Dan Estes, who coached the Bears from 1915 to 1932.

History

Renovations
The west (home) side of the stadium was torn down and rebuilt from the ground up before the 1998 season. The $5 million facility houses the entire football program, including dressing room, weight room, meeting and film rooms, equipment room, coaches' offices and athletic training room.

On April 1, 2011, UCA announced plans to install a purple and gray striped football field for the 2011 season. Installation of the field began in late April, following the conclusion of spring practice, and finished in June.

Attendance
The all-time attendance record, 12,755, was set on September 1, 2011, vs. Henderson State.

See also
 List of NCAA Division I FCS football stadiums
 List of college football stadiums with non-traditional field colors

References

External links
 First Security Field @ Estes Stadium (at Central Arkansas Athletics website, with photos)

Sports venues in Arkansas
Central Arkansas Bears football
College football venues
University of Central Arkansas
Multi-purpose stadiums in the United States
Buildings and structures in Conway, Arkansas
American football venues in Arkansas
1939 establishments in Arkansas
Sports venues completed in 1939